The 2015 Women's Premier Soccer League season is the 19th season of the WPSL.

Standings

Northwest

Pacific-North

Pacific-South

Big Sky

Midwest - Central

Midwest - Great Lakes

Northeast

Can Am

Power 5

Mid Atlantic

South Atlantic

Sunshine

Southeast

Playoffs

References

Women's Premier Soccer League seasons
United States Adult Soccer Association leagues
2